Uruguay sent a delegation to compete at the 2008 Summer Paralympics in Beijing. The country was represented by two athletes, competing in two sports.

Athletics

Judo

See also
2008 Summer Paralympics
Uruguay at the Paralympics
Uruguay at the 2008 Summer Olympics

External links
Beijing 2008 Paralympic Games Official Site
International Paralympic Committee

References

Nations at the 2008 Summer Paralympics
2008
Paralympics